The El Vado Auto Court is a historic motel in Albuquerque, New Mexico, located along former 
U.S. Route 66. Built in 1937, it operated until 2005 and reopened in 2018 after renovations. The motel was listed on the New Mexico State Register of Cultural Properties and National Register of Historic Places in 1993, and was also designated an Albuquerque city landmark in 2008.

After nearly 70 years in business, El Vado was purchased in 2005 by a new owner who intended to clear the site for redevelopment. After a lengthy legal battle, the motel was designated a landmark by the Albuquerque City Council, granting it a measure of protection. Ultimately the property was sold to the city in 2010, launching the renovation efforts.

The motel consists of a pair of long, one-story buildings separated by a landscaped courtyard (originally a parking lot). It is an example of Pueblo Revival architecture, with stepped massing, irregular parapets, vigas, and buttressed, stuccoed walls. The 2016–18 renovations added a new swimming pool as well as several small retail spaces and a tap room.

References

External links

Hotel buildings completed in 1937
Hotels in Albuquerque, New Mexico
Buildings and structures on U.S. Route 66
Hotel buildings on the National Register of Historic Places in New Mexico
Motels in the United States
U.S. Route 66 in New Mexico
New Mexico State Register of Cultural Properties
National Register of Historic Places in Albuquerque, New Mexico
Pueblo Revival architecture in Albuquerque, New Mexico
1937 establishments in New Mexico